Scandal Incorporated is a 1956 American crime film directed by Edward Mann and written by Milton Mann. The film stars Robert Hutton, Patricia Wright, Paul Richards, Robert Knapp, Havis Davenport and Reid Hammond. It was released on October 12, 1956 by Republic Pictures.

Plot

Cast

References

External links 
 

1956 films
American crime films
1956 crime films
Republic Pictures films
1950s English-language films
1950s American films
American black-and-white films